Microneta is a genus of dwarf spiders that was first described by Anton Menge in 1869.

Species
 it contains eleven species:
Microneta caestata (Thorell, 1875) – Sweden
Microneta disceptra Crosby & Bishop, 1929 – Peru
Microneta flaveola Banks, 1892 – USA
Microneta formicaria Balogh, 1938 – New Guinea
Microneta inops (Thorell, 1875) – Sweden
Microneta orines Chamberlin & Ivie, 1933 – USA
Microneta semiatra (Keyserling, 1886) – Brazil
Microneta sima Chamberlin & Ivie, 1936 – Mexico
Microneta varia Simon, 1898 – St. Vincent
Microneta viaria (Blackwall, 1841) (type) – North America, Europe, Turkey, North Africa, Caucasus, Russia (European to Far East), China, Mongolia, Korea, Japan
Microneta watona Chamberlin & Ivie, 1936 – Mexico

See also
 List of Linyphiidae species (I–P)

References

Araneomorphae genera
Linyphiidae
Spiders of Asia
Spiders of North America
Spiders of South America